The Baldy Hill Formation is a geologic formation in northeastern New Mexico and western Oklahoma. It preserves fossils dating back to the late Triassic period.

Description 
The Baldy Hill Formation is a dark purple, reddish brown, or greenish gray silty to sandy mudstone with some fine-grained sandstone.  Its base is not exposed at the type section, but it is at least . It is overlain by the Travesser Formation, with the contact marked by the Cobert Canyon Sandstone Bed, a persistent layer of conglomerate beds now assigned to the Baldy Hill Formation or possibly the overlying Travesser Formation (which in turn is sometimes regarded as equivalent to the Chinle Formation.)

The formation may correlate with either the Garita Creek Formation or the Los Esteros Member of the Santa Rosa Formation.

Fossils 
Fossils of amphibians and phytosaurs of Carnian to Norian age have been found in the Cobert Canyon Sandstone.

History of investigation
The formation was first named by Baldwin and Muehlberger in 1959, for exposures around Baldy Hill in the valley of the Dry Cimarron.

See also

 List of fossiliferous stratigraphic units in Oklahoma
 Paleontology in Oklahoma

References

Triassic formations of New Mexico
Triassic geology of Oklahoma